Lauri Jaakko Kivekäs, titled Vuorineuvos (7 July 1903, in Muuruvesi, Finland – 12 February 1998; surname until 1926 Stenbäck), was a Finnish businessman. He served as Minister of Trade and Industry from 1957 to 1958. He was the former Chairman of Confederation of Finnish Industries and the first Chairman of Nokia Corporation after the 1967 merger of the three Finnish companies Nokia Company, Finnish Rubber Works and Finnish Cable Works. He remained Nokia Chairman until 1977 when he was replaced by Björn Westerlund.

References

1903 births
1998 deaths
People from Juankoski
People from Kuopio Province (Grand Duchy of Finland)
Ministers of Trade and Industry of Finland
20th-century Finnish businesspeople
Nokia people
University of Helsinki alumni